The State of Buenos Aires was a secessionist republic resulting from the overthrow of the Argentine Confederation government in the Province of Buenos Aires on September 11, 1852. The State of Buenos Aires was never recognized by the Confederation; it remained, however, independent under its own government and constitution. Buenos Aires rejoined the Argentine Confederation after the former's victory at the Battle of Pavón in 1861.

Historical overview

Background
Regionalism had long marked the relationship among the numerous provinces of what today is Argentina, and the wars of independence did not result in national unity. Following a series of disorders and a short-lived Constitutional Republic led by Buenos Aires centralist Bernardino Rivadavia in 1826 and 1827, the Province of Buenos Aires would function as a semi-independent state amid an internecine civil war.

An understanding was entered into by Buenos Aires Governor Juan Manuel de Rosas and other Federalist leaders out of need and a shared enmity toward the still vigorous Unitarian Party. The latter's 1830 establishment of the Unitarian League from nine western and northern provinces would force Buenos Aires, Corrientes and Entre Ríos Provinces into the Federal Pact of 1831, and enabled the overthrow of the Unitarian League.

The granting of the sum of public power to Rosas in 1835 established a dynamic whereby leaders (caudillos) from the hinterland provinces would delegate certain powers, such as foreign debt payment or the management of international relations to the Buenos Aires leader. The Argentine Confederation thus functioned, albeit amid ongoing conflicts, until the 1852 Battle of Caseros, when Rosas was deposed and exiled.

Establishment
The central figure in the overthrow of Rosas, Entre Ríos Governor Justo José de Urquiza, was granted the power of a head of state by the Palermo Protocols of April 6, 1852. This provoked resistance in Buenos Aires, however, which then refused to ratify the San Nicolás Agreement of May 31. The prospect of having the Argentine Congress headquartered in Santa Fe proved especially objectionable, and Urquiza's June 12 appointment of former President Vicente López y Planes failed to turn public opinion in Buenos Aires. Colonel Bartolomé Mitre rallied the Assembly against the San Nicolás Accords. The most contentious issue remained the Buenos Aires Customs, which remained under the control of the city government and was the chief source of public revenue. Nations with which the Confederation maintained foreign relations, moreover, kept all embassies in Buenos Aires (rather than in the capital, Paraná).

Governor López y Planes ultimately resigned on July 26, prompting Urquiza to seize the governor's post through a Federal intervention decree. His departure to Santa Fe on September 8 for the inaugural session of Congress prompted the September 11 coup d'état against the provisional administration of Governor José Miguel Galán. Led in its military aspect by General José María Pirán and ideologically by Dr. Valentín Alsina and Colonel Mitre, the September 11 revolt created the foremost threat to both the Confederation and Urquiza: Alsina ordered General Juan Madariaga to invade Santa Fe within days of the coup (though without success).

Naming the aging Manuel Guillermo Pinto as governor, Alsina secured the allegiance of the deposed Governor Galán, as well as of a number of key Federalist figures such as former top Rosas advisor Lorenzo Torres. Alsina, who was elected governor by the Legislature on October 31, alienated Colonel Hilario Lagos, however. Lagos persuaded War Minister José María Floresto to leave Buenos Aires and, on December 1, initiated the Siege of Buenos Aires. Alsina resigned and Pinto, who served as president of the Legislature, again took office as governor. The siege continued through June 1853, and Urquiza commissioned a naval flotilla to blockade Buenos Aires (whose chief source of revenue was duty collected at the port). The commander of the flotilla, U.S.-born Admiral Jonas Halstead Coe, was bribed with 5,000 troy ounces of gold, however, on June 20, and following his relinquishment of the flotilla to Buenos Aires, Urquiza called off the siege on July 12.

Constitutional government
Jurist Pastor Obligado was elected governor by the Legislature on June 28, 1853. He obtained passeage of the Constitution of Buenos Aires on April 12, 1854, and initiated an ambitious public works program, installing the first gas lamps and running water system in the city, and establishing what later became the Colegio Nacional de Buenos Aires, as well as a network of public primary schools for the largely illiterate population at the time. The 1854 constitution, drafted by Dalmacio Vélez Sársfield, asserted the sovereignty of Buenos Aires, including its right to engage in its own diplomatic relations, as well as a bicameral legislature and freedom of worship.

Obligado reformed the practice of emphyteusis, whereupon land could then be sold at a regulated rate of 16,000 silver pesos (pesos fuerte, nearly at par with the U.S. dollar) per square league (4,428 acres). He established a national mint under the auspices of the Bank of the Province of Buenos Aires, and subsidies for industry and commerce; on August 30, 1857, the recently established Buenos Aires Western Railway inaugurated its first line, designed by British engineer William Bragge. A census conducted on October 17, 1855, found a population of 248,498 for the State of Buenos Aires, of which 71,438 lived in the capital.

In 1855 the Paraguayan government of Carlos Antonio López, annoyed that the Congress of the Argentine Confederation had refused to ratify the 1852 Treaty of Limits (by which the Argentine Confederation would have got the territory of Misiones, but Paraguay would have got the Chaco north of the Bermejo River), established relations with the State of Buenos Aires and appointed a Paraguayan consul.

Persistent budget deficits in the Confederation led the Paraná government to establish the Port of Rosario, and to enter into free trade agreements with the Port of Montevideo (to the detriment of Buenos Aires). Worsening relations led to the re-election of Valentín Alsina as governor at the end of 1858, and in February 1859, Alsina enacted retaliatory tariffs against Confederate goods.

Tensions culminated in the Battle of Cepeda of October 23, 1859. Buenos Aires forces, led by General Mitre, were defeated by those led by President Urquiza. Ordered by Congress in Santa Fe to subjugate Buenos Aires separatists by force, Urquiza instead invited the defeated to join negotiations, though he obtained Alsina's resignation. These talks resulted in the Pact of San José de Flores of November 11, 1859, which provided for a number of constitutional amendments and led to other concessions, including an extension on the province's customs house concession and measures benefiting the Bank of the Province of Buenos Aires, whose currency was authorized for use as legal tender at the port (thereby controlling much of the nation's foreign trade).

Mitre ultimately abrogated the Pact of San José, leading to renewed civil war. These hostilities culminated in the 1861 Battle of Pavón, and to victory on the part of Mitre and Buenos Aires over Urquiza's national forces. President Santiago Derqui, who had been backed by Urquiza, and all Federalist governors resigned, and the Argentine Confederation was replaced by the Argentine Republic on December 12, 1861. Mitre, who despite victory reaffirmed his commitment to the 1860 constitutional amendments, was elected the republic's first president on September 4, 1862, and remained Governor of Buenos Aires as caretaker until his October 12, 1862, inaugural.

References

Bibliography
 
Historical Dictionary of Argentina. London: Scarecrow Press, 1978.

Former political divisions related to Argentina
Former countries in South America
History of Argentina (1852–1880)
Argentine Civil War
State of Buenos Aires
States and territories established in 1852
States and territories disestablished in 1861
Former unrecognized countries
1852 establishments in South America
1861 disestablishments in South America
19th century in Buenos Aires